Produce is a generalized term for many farm-produced crops, including fruits and vegetables (grains, oats, etc. are also sometimes considered produce). More specifically, the term produce often implies that the products are fresh and generally in the same state as where and when they were harvested.

In supermarkets, the term is also used to refer to the section of the store where fruit and vegetables are kept. Produce is the main product sold by greengrocers (UK, Australia) and farmers' markets. The term is widely and commonly used in the U.S. and Canada, but is not typically used outside the agricultural sector in other English-speaking countries.

In parts of the world, including the U.S., produce is marked with small stickers bearing price look-up codes. These four- or five-digit codes are a standardized system intended to aid checkout and inventory control at places where produce is sold.

Storage 
Vegetables are optimally stored between 0° and 4.4° Celsius (32° and 40 °F) to reduce respiration. Generally, vegetables should be stored at a high humidity (80 and 95 percent relative humidity), but cucurbits (squash family) and onions prefer dry and can mold when moisture is high.

Bacterial contamination 

Raw sprouts are among the produce most at risk of bacterial infection.

Rinsing is an effective way to reduce the bacteria count on produce, reducing it to about 10 percent of its previous level.

Wastewater used on vegetables can be a source of contamination, due to contamination with fecal matter, salmonella or other bacteria. After Denmark eliminated salmonella in its chickens, attention has turned to vegetables as a source of illness due to feces contamination from other animal sources, such as pigs.

See also

 Food industry
 Food labeling regulations
 Food traceability
 Geography of food
 Produce traceability

Notable people 

 Frieda Rapoport Caplan
 James Dole

References

Further reading 

 Doyle, Martin (1857). Farm & Garden Produce: A Treasury of Information. G. Routledge & Co. OCLC Number: 39049007
 Microbial Safety of Fresh Produce - Google Books
 The Produce Contamination Problem: Causes and Solutions - Google Books
 Produce Degradation: Pathways and Prevention - Google Books
 Decontamination of Fresh and Minimally Processed Produce - Google Books
 Microbiology of Fresh Produce - Google Books
 Slow food: A Passion for Produce - Google Books
 Melissa's Everyday Cooking with Organic Produce - Google Books
 Procurement and Marketing of Minor Forest Produce in Tribal Areas - Google Books
 Public Produce: The New Urban Agriculture - Google Books
 Global standard for food safety: guideline for category 5 fresh produce (North American version) - Google Books

External links

Crops
Food retailing
Edible fruits
Vegetables